The Siberian Evangelical Lutheran Church (Сибирская Евангелическо-Лютеранская Церковь) is a Russian Lutheran church whose bishop is Vsevolod Lytkin. It was officially founded in 2003, and participates in the International Lutheran Council. The church was previously associated with the Estonian Evangelical Lutheran Church since its beginnings as a Christian mission in Novosibirsk in 1993. It has 25 congregations with 2100 members and 19 clergymen.

See also 
Evangelical Lutheran Church of Ingria

References 

Siberian Evangelical Lutheran Church newest Missouri Synod partner church

External links 
 

Lutheranism in Russia
International Lutheran Council members
Christian organizations established in 2003
Evangelical denominations in Asia